James Talbot is a Northern Irish international lawn and indoor bowler.

Bowls career
Talbot is from County Antrim, in Northern Ireland and he won a bronze medal in the triples and fours at the 2012 World Outdoor Bowls Championship.

He won the gold medal at the 2011 World Cup Singles in Warilla, New South Wales, Australia.

References 

Male lawn bowls players from Northern Ireland
Living people
Year of birth missing (living people)